Andizhan Airport  is an airport serving Andijan (also spelled Andijan), the capital city of the Andijan Region in Uzbekistan.

9th Guards Fighter Aviation Regiment PVO of the Soviet Air Defence Forces arrived at the airport in November 1955 and was taken over by the Military of Uzbekistan in October 1992. From 4.86 to Oct 1992 it was part of 15th Air Defence Division (12th Air Defence Army).

Facilities

Airlines and destinations

See also
List of the busiest airports in the former USSR
Transportation in Uzbekistan

References

External links
 Airport diagram for UTFA
 

Airports in Uzbekistan
Andijan